Acacia howittii, commonly known as sticky wattle or Howitt's wattle, is a tree species that is endemic to Victoria, Australia.

Description
The thin dark green phyllodes have a narrowly elliptic to lanceolate shape with two to three distinct nerves per face. The globular pale-yellow flowerheads appear in the leaf axils in October (in Australia). The simple inflorescences occur singly or in pairs in the axils and have spherical flower-heads that contain 12 to 20 pale yellow lemon yellow flowers. The seeds inside are arranged longitudinally.

Taxonomy
The species was first formally described by Victorian Government Botanist Ferdinand von Mueller in The Victorian Naturalist  in 1893. Mueller's description was based on material collected by Alfred William Howitt, for whom the species is named.
It was reclassified as Racosperma howittii by Leslie Pedley in 2003 but was transferred back to genus Acacia in 2006.
It belongs to the Acacia verniciflua complex where hybrids occur between A. howittii and the Dandenong variant of Acacia leprosa.

Distribution
It is native to an area in eastern Victoria from around the from the upper reaches of the Macalister River area near Mount Howitt in the north and down to around Yarram in the south and extending east to around Tabberabbera where it is usually situated in moist forest environments.
Although regarded as a rare species, it is commonly cultivated, and has become naturalised in areas outside its original range.

References

howittii
Flora of Victoria (Australia)
Fabales of Australia
Taxa named by Ferdinand von Mueller
Plants described in 1893